Bloody Mountain is located in the Sierra Nevada 1 mile South East of Mammoth Lakes (Mono County) in eastern California in the southwestern United States.

History 

The origin of the name Bloody Mountain is unclear. Some hold it was named for the color of the rocks of the mountain, while others believe it was named for a bloody skirmish between the sheriff and escaped convicts in 1871.

References 

Mountains of Mono County, California
Mountains of the John Muir Wilderness
Mountains of Northern California